Lecanicephaloidea is an order of tapeworms of the subclass Cestoda. Species in the order consist of intestinal parasites of elasmobranch fishes.

Anatomy 
The order is distinguished in that the scolex consists of two parts. The lower half forms a neck bearing four small suckers. The upper half is either globular or tentacle-bearing, and shows glandular structures.

The anatomy of the order is similar to that of the Proteocephaloidea.

References 

Parasitic helminths of fish
Cestoda
Platyhelminthes orders